The Mayor of Palm Springs, California is a largely ceremonial title, elected at-large, with no executive functions. The Mayor is the chairman of the city council meetings. The legislative body is the five-member city council, which is voted into office by public elections. The Council appoints a professional manager to oversee the administrative operations, implement its policies, and advise it. The city of Palm Springs is a council-manager type government.

The office of mayor was created in 1938 when Palm Springs was officially established as a city. Palm Springs residents voted on the issue of incorporation and for the first members of the city council on April 12, 1938. There were 910 registered voters in the city. Voters cast their ballots 442 in favor and 211 opposed. Upon certification of the election results the city's incorporation was finalized on April 20, 1938.

The mayor was not directly elected until 1982. Palm Springs Mayors serve a four-year term. There are no term limits for the mayor or members of the city council.

This is a list of mayors of Palm Springs, California.

See also
 Palm Springs Walk of Stars – which has "Golden Palm Stars" dedicated to former mayors Farrell, Bogert, Foster, Bono and Oden.
 List of people from Palm Springs, California

References

Palm Springs